The Bradford Grand Mosque, or Al-Jamia Suffa-Tul-Islam Grand Mosque, is the largest mosque in Bradford, West Yorkshire, England.

It was founded in 1983, building began in 2002 and it opened in 2012 or 2014. It can house 8,000 worshippers and is one of the largest mosques in the United Kingdom. The mosque was built on a filled in railway cutting which was part of the Bradford "Alpine" railway which ran through the Little Horton area of Bradford. At a cost of more than £4 million, the construction of the mosque was paid with local donations. In 2019, construction of additional buildings began.

The Telegraph & Argus called it "one of the most architecturally impressive religious buildings in the city."

In November 2018 the mosque arranged a march for peace in memory of the prophet Muhammad. In March 2020, during the COVID-19 pandemic, a funeral with around 600 people held at the mosque was connected to an outbreak of COVID-19.

References

External links

Mosques in England
Bradford